Santa Fe de Mondújar is a municipality of the Province of Almería, in the autonomous community of Andalusia, Spain.

Demographics

References

External links
  Santa Fe de Mondújar - Sistema de Información Multiterritorial de Andalucía
  Santa Fe de Mondújar - Diputación Provincial de Almería

Municipalities in the Province of Almería